Mohamed Saad may refer to:

Mohamed Saad (actor), Egyptian film actor
Mohamed Saad (athlete), Kuwaiti sprinter
Mohamed Saad (swimmer), Yemeni swimmer